Mezőkövesdi Városi Stadion is a sports stadium in Mezőkövesd, Hungary. The stadium is home to association football side Mezőkövesdi SE. The stadium has a capacity of 4,183.

History
The Hungarian government decided to support the reconstruction of the stadium by 400 million HUF. These funds covered expenses of the construction of the main stand.

The renovated stadium opened on 5 June 2016.

On 5 June 2016 the first match was played in the stadium. Mezőkövesdi SE hosted Dunaújváros PASE on the 30th match day in the 2015–16 Nemzeti Bajnokság II season. The match was won by the home team which also resulted the club's promotion to the 2016–17 Nemzeti Bajnokság I.

In the 2016–17 Nemzeti Bajnokság I season Diósgyőri VTK played some of their home matches due to the demolition of their home stadium Diósgyőri Stadion. Nevertheless, when Diósgyőr hosted Mezőkövesd on the 31st match day the match was played at Debrecen's home stadium, Nagyerdei Stadion.

On 20 June 2017, it was announced that Diósgyőr will not play their home matches at the Városi Stadion because the turf cannot endure it. As a consequence, Diósgyőr will play the home matches of the 2017–18 Nemzeti Bajnokság I matches at stadium of Debreceni VSC', Nagyerdei Stadion, in Debrecen.

Milestone matches

Average attendances

This table includes only domestic league matches.

Gallery

References

External links 
Magyarfutball.hu 

Football venues in Hungary
Mezőkövesdi SE